Paduka Sri Sultan Mukaddam Shah (died 1619) was the sixth Sultan of Perak. He is the son of the sister of Sultan Ahmad Tajuddin and Sultan Tajul Ariffin, and he was the cousin of Raja Kecil Lasa Raja Inu. Before becoming Sultan, he was known as Raja Tua.

Sultan Mukaddam Shah, resided in an area known today as Bota Kanan. According to the stories of the elders, one of the princesses of Sultan Mukaddam Shah named Putri Limau Purut is very beautiful in appearance. The princess was betrothed to her second cousin, Raja Mansur (younger brother of Sultan Alauddin Shah). Therefore, the proposal of Sultan Iskandar Muda of Aceh who came to propose to Putri Limau Purut was rejected by Sultan Mukaddam Shah. This made the Sultan of Aceh angry and dissatisfied.

Considering the rejection, the Sultan of Aceh ordered his army to fight with Perak. The Aceh army defeated Perak and the Sultan of Perak and the Queen of Perak were captured by the Aceh Sultanate's army. Likewise, Putri Limau Purut who was also captured along with her nanny Esah Gerbang and several of his entourage by the Acehnese army. All the captives were taken to Aceh and Sultan Mukaddam Shah later died while in Aceh and got the title Marhum di Aceh. In that time, a bendahara from Perak named Megat Abdullah had conducted a prisoner rescue operation. Thanks to Megat Abdullah's efforts and courage, Putri Limau Purut was finally brought back to Perak and was married to her fiancé, Raja Mansur.

There is also a story that states that Raja Mansur was also captured and taken to Aceh together with the relatives of Sultan Mukaddam Shah. However, Raja Mansur was able to escape and fled to the Johor. In Johor, he married a Jambi princess, and in 1619 he returned to Perak to marry Putri Limau Purut and ascended the throne of the State of Perak with the title of Sultan Mansur Shah II.

At the end of the reign of the late Sultan Mukaddam Shah in 1619, Sultan Iskandar Muda of Aceh who was mighty at that time sent his army to attack and re-conquer Perak and other states in the Malay Peninsula. To this day, it is still unknown and untraceable where the actual location of Sultan Mukaddam Shah's tomb is. What is certain, it is located in Aceh, outside of Perak.

References 

Sultans of Perak
1619 deaths
Royal House of Perak
Malay people
People of Malay descent
Muslim monarchs
Sultans
Sunni monarchs
People from Perak